WJWM-LP was a station to the U.S. Virgin Islands, being founded on March 3, 2005, along with W35CE, the local TBN affiliate. Its signal, however, does not even cover all of the island of Saint Croix, let alone the other islands.

External links

FCCinfo.com
TVRadioWorld.com

JWM-LP
Television channels and stations established in 2005
Defunct television stations in the United States
Television channels and stations disestablished in 2013
2005 establishments in the United States Virgin Islands
2013 disestablishments in the United States Virgin Islands
JWM-LP